Henricus Antonius Franciscus Maria Oliva "Hans" van Mierlo (18 August 1931 – 11 March 2010) was a Dutch politician and journalist who co-founded Democrats 66 (D66).

Van Mierlo studied Law at the Radboud University Nijmegen obtaining a Master of Laws degree and worked as a journalist and editor for the Algemeen Handelsblad from August 1960 until January 1967. In October 1966 Van Mierlo was one of the co-founders of the Democrats 66 (initially abbreviated D'66) party and became its first lijsttrekker (party leader) for the election of 1967. Van Mierlo was elected as a Member of the House of Representatives and became Parliamentary leader after the election on 23 February 1967. For the elections of 1971 and 1972 Van Mierlo served again as top candidate. On 1 September 1973 Van Mierlo unexpectedly announced he was stepping down as Leader and Parliamentary leader and that he wouldn't stand for the election of 1977 but would continue to serve in the House of Representatives as a frontbencher until the end of the parliamentary term.

Van Mierlo semi-retired from active politics and became active in the public sector as a non-profit director, and worked as a television producer for the VARA from January 1980 until September 1981. After the election of 1981 Van Mierlo was appointed as Minister of Defence in the Cabinet Van Agt II taking office on 11 September 1981. The Cabinet Van Agt II fell just seven months into its term on 12 May 1982 and was replaced by the caretaker Cabinet Van Agt III with Van Mierlo continuing his position and shortly thereafter announced that he wouldn't not stand for the election of 1982. Van Mierlo continued to be active in politics and was elected as a Member of the Senate after the Senate election of 1983 on 13 September 1983 serving as a frontbencher and spokesperson for Foreign Affairs. For the election of 1986 Van Mierlo again served as Lijsttrekker and returned as a Member of the House of Representatives and Parliamentary leader on 3 June 1986. For the elections of 1989 and 1994 Van Mierlo once again served as Lijsttrekker and following a successful cabinet formation with Labour Leader Wim Kok and Liberal Leader Frits Bolkestein formed the Cabinet Kok I with Van Mierlo appointed as Deputy Prime Minister and Minister of Foreign Affairs taking office on 22 August 1994. In March 1997 Van Mierlo announced that he was stepping down as Leader a second time but that he would stand for the election of 1998. After a cabinet formation Van Mierlo was asked to continue to serve in the new cabinet in a different function but declined and returned to the House of Representatives on 19 May 1998. Shortly after the installation of the Cabinet Kok II Van Mierlo announced his retirement and resigned from the House of Representatives on 18 August 1998.

Van Mierlo retired from active politics at 67 and again became active in the public sector as a non-profit director and served as a diplomat for several economic and diplomatic delegations on behalf of the government, and continued to be active as a advocate and lobbyist for more European integration, republican issues and government reforms. Van Mierlo was known for his abilities as a skillful debater and effective negotiator. Van Mierlo was granted the honorary title of Minister of State on 24 October 1998 and continued to comment on political affairs as a statesman until his death in March 2010 from the complications of a Hepatitis C infection at the age of 78.

Early life

Henricus Antonius Franciscus Maria Oliva van Mierlo was born on 18 August 1931 in Breda in the province of North Brabant in a Roman Catholic family as the second child of eight children of Anthonius Alphonsus Marie van Mierlo (born 9 May 1902) and Adriana Maria Francisca van der Schrieck (born 3 April 1905). After receiving his diploma Gymnasium-A at the Canisius College in Nijmegen he studied at the Radboud University Nijmegen, where he received a Bachelor of Laws and Master of Laws degree in 1960. After graduating, he became a journalist for the NRC Handelsblad and worked as a managing editor from 1960 until 1967, first as an editor Home Affairs, later as the opinion page's chief editor.

Politics

Party foundation
In 1966 Van Mierlo together with Hans Gruijters founded the Democrats 66 party after continuing frustrations with The Establishment parties. Van Mierlo was selected as Leader and Chairman of the Democrats 66 on 14 October 1966. For the Dutch general election of 1967 Van Mierlo was the lijsttrekker (top candidate) and won seven seats in the House of Representatives, the first time the Democrats 66 won representation in the States General of the Netherlands.

Van Mierlo was elected as a member of the House of Representatives and the parliamentary leader of the Democrats 66 in the House on 23 February 1967. For the Dutch general elections of 1971 Van Mierlo again as lijsttrekker won eleven seats. For the Dutch general election of 1972 Van Mierlo for the third time as lijsttrekker won only six seats but after a long formation period a coalition agreement with the Labour Party (PvdA), Catholic People's Party (KVP), Anti-Revolutionary Party (ARP) and the Political Party of Radicals (PPR) was made which formed the Cabinet Den Uyl.

Hans Gruijters became Minister of Housing and Spatial Planning. Because of the disappointing election results Van Mierlo resigned as parliamentary leader of the Democrats 66 in the House of Representatives and Leader of the Democrats 66 on 1 September 1973. Van Mierlo remained a member of the House until after the Dutch general election of 1977 on 8 June 1977.

Cabinet of Dries van Agt
After the Dutch general election of 1981 Van Mierlo was asked by Jan Terlouw to become Minister of Defence in the Second Van Agt cabinet under Prime Minister Dries van Agt of the Christian Democratic Appeal (CDA) and served from 11 September 1981 until 4 November 1982. After the Dutch Senate election of 1983 Van Mierlo was elected as a Senator serving from 13 September 1983 until 4 June 1986.

In 1986 Van Mierlo staged a political comeback and was reelected as Leader of the Democrats 66 on 25 January 1986. For the Dutch general election of 1986 Van Mierlo back as lijsttrekker won nine seats. For the Dutch general election of 1989 Van Mierlo again as lijsttrekker won twelve seats. For the Dutch general election of 1994 Van Mierlo for the sixth time as Lijsttrekker won twenty four seats and the Democrats 66 became major-party in the House of Representatives.

Cabinet of Wim Kok
After an arduous cabinet formation with the Labour Party and the People's Party for Freedom and Democracy (VVD) a deal was struck that resulted in the First Kok cabinet with Van Mierlo becoming Deputy Prime Minister and Minister of Foreign Affairs serving from 22 August 1994 until 3 August 1998.

The First Kok cabinet was considered groundbreaking in Dutch politics because it was the first Cabinet of the Netherlands since 1908 without a Christian democratic party. On 7 March 1997 Van Mierlo announced his retirement as Leader of the Democrats 66. Van Mierlo remained Deputy Prime Minister and Minister of Foreign Affairs until the Second Kok cabinet was installed on 3 August 1998. For the Dutch general election of 1998 Van Mierlo was reelected to the House of Representatives on 19 May 1998 but resigned on 18 August 1998.

Convention on the Future of Europe
Van Mierlo semi-retired from active politics on his sixty-seventh birthday. He served as the first Dutch representative to the Convention on the Future of Europe from 1 March 2002 until 26 September 2002. Following the end of his active political career, Van Mierlo occupied numerous seats on supervisory boards on cultural organizations.

Personal
He was appointed Minister of State on October 24, 1998, a mainly honorary title for politicians with an extensive history of government service. Hans van Mierlo has been married three times. He has a son from his first marriage and two daughters from the second. Since 1999 Van Mierlo had a relationship with the Dutch writer Connie Palmen; they got married on 11 November 2009, in Amsterdam.

Death
Hans van Mierlo died on 11 March 2010 at the age of 78; he had been living with a transplanted liver since 2000 which was required after liver failure as a consequence of a hepatitis C contamination contracted from a blood transfusion in 1982.

Decorations

References

External links

Official
  Mr. H.A.F.M.O. (Hans) van Mierlo Parlement & Politiek
  Mr. H.A.F.M.O. van Mierlo (D66) Eerste Kamer der Staten-Generaal

 

 

 

1931 births
2010 deaths
Chairmen of the Democrats 66
Commanders of the Order of Orange-Nassau
Commanders of the Order of the Netherlands Lion
Commandeurs of the Légion d'honneur
Deaths from hepatitis
Democrats 66 politicians
Deputy Prime Ministers of the Netherlands
Dutch atheists
Dutch expatriates in Belgium
Dutch expatriates in England
Dutch former Christians
Dutch humanists
Dutch magazine editors
Dutch newspaper editors
Dutch nonprofit directors
Dutch nonprofit executives
Dutch political commentators
Dutch political journalists
Dutch political party founders
Dutch political philosophers
Dutch political writers
Dutch television producers
Former Roman Catholics
Grand Crosses with Star and Sash of the Order of Merit of the Federal Republic of Germany
Leaders of the Democrats 66
Liver transplant recipients
Members of the House of Representatives (Netherlands)
Members of the Senate (Netherlands)
Ministers of Defence of the Netherlands
Ministers of Foreign Affairs of the Netherlands
Ministers of State (Netherlands)
People from Breda
Radboud University Nijmegen alumni
Royal Netherlands Army personnel
Writers about direct democracy
Writers from Amsterdam
20th-century Dutch journalists
20th-century Dutch male writers
20th-century Dutch military personnel
20th-century Dutch politicians
21st-century Dutch male writers